Dingana fraterna, the Stoffberg widow, is a butterfly of the family Nymphalidae. It is only known from one hillside to the south-west of the Stoffberg in the Mpumalanga province.

The wingspan is 56–61 mm for males and 55–57 mm for females. Adults are on wing from mid-to late October. There is one generation per year

The larvae probably feed on various Poaceae species.

References

Butterflies described in 1996
Satyrini